Gamzatov is a surname. Notable people with the surname include:

 Rasul Gamzatov (1923–2003), Avar poet
 Shamil Gamzatov (born 1990), Russian mixed martial artist

See also
 7509 Gamzatov, minor planet